Milton Green (October 31, 1913 – March 30, 2005) was a world record holder in high hurdles during the 1930s.

He was born in Lowell, Massachusetts in 1913 and attended Harvard University.

He first equaled the world mark of 5.8 seconds in 45-yard high hurdles in 1935 at a track meet with Yale University and Princeton University.

He tied the world record for 60-Meter high hurdles of 7.5 seconds at an Olympic trial heat at Madison Square Garden in early 1936.  Green was considered sure to make the team in 1936, but chose not to participate.  He protested the event being held in Berlin, center of Nazi Germany.

Although Green remained a world class hurdler for many years, he was convinced by his rabbi to boycott the Olympic Games based on what was happening in Nazi Germany. The boycott by Milton Green and Harvard teammate Norman Cahners was not publicized at the time.

Green had this to say on an interview transcribed by the US Holocaust Museum.
"Both Cahners and I decided that we would boycott the Olympics. We just felt it was the right thing to do. I spoke to the track coach at Harvard. We told him about our intention. He tried to persuade us not to do it. He said he didn't think it would do much good, and we should try to go to the final tryouts and try to make the team. But we didn't want to do that. After we boycotted the Olympics, no one came to speak to us or ask us if we'd make any statements about it. And I don't think anyone knew particularly that we did boycott it. I think back on making that decision and whether I would have won silver or gold or some sort of a medal, and every time I go to the Olympics—I've been to three of them—I particularly watch the high hurdles and the long jump, and I picture myself as maybe having won a medal in it."

After service in the United States Army in World War II, Milton became a shopping center developer until he retired in 1971.

He was inducted into The Harvard Athletic Hall of Fame in 1961.

He was elected into The International Jewish Sports Hall of Fame in 1997.

See also
List of select Jewish track and field athletes

References

External links
Bio on JewishSports.net

"Video clip of Milton Green racing in 1935" - British Pathe archive footage: Milton Green races for Harvard and wins, 1935.

Jewish American sportspeople
Jewish male athletes (track and field)
Harvard Crimson men's track and field athletes
1913 births
2005 deaths
American male hurdlers
Sportspeople from Lowell, Massachusetts
United States Army soldiers
United States Army personnel of World War II
20th-century American Jews
21st-century American Jews